Stoer is a township in Scotland. Stoer may also refer to:

People
Josef Stoer (*1934), German mathematician

See also 
Old Man of Stoer
Stoer Head